The Albanian Committee of Janina was an Albanian organization of the 19th century with the aim of defending Albanian rights.

The Albanian Committee of Janina was formed in May 1877 in Janina then a city of the Ottoman Empire in the Vilayet of Janina, by prominent Muslim Albanian personalities of the Vilayet and central figures of the Albanian National Awakening. Abdyl Frashëri from Përmet, Abedin Dino from Preveza, Mehmet Ali Vrioni from Berat, Vesel Dino from Preveza, and other notable members of the Vilayet's Albanian community.

As no political decisions, documents or an official seal were issued, the group was not an organized committee functioning as a political organization, but a group of Tosk Albanians interested in the Albanian national movement having similar ideas about the future of Albanians.

See also 
 Albanian National Awakening
 League of Prizren
 Convention of Dibra

References 

1877 disestablishments
Secret societies in Albania
Organizations of the Albanian National Awakening
Ottoman Ioannina
1877 establishments in the Ottoman Empire
Albanian Question